Cheyenne David Jackson (born July 12, 1975) is an American actor and singer. His credits include leading roles in Broadway musicals and other stage roles, as well as film and television roles, concert singing, and music recordings.

After beginning his acting career in regional theatre in Seattle, Washington, Jackson moved to Manhattan and was an understudy in Thoroughly Modern Millie (2002) and Aida (2003). He next originated the role of Matthew in the workshop production of Altar Boyz (2004) for the New York Musical Theatre Festival, and was replaced by Scott Porter for the Off-Broadway run. Jackson's first leading role on Broadway was in All Shook Up (2005), which earned him a Theatre World Award for "Outstanding Broadway Debut". Since then, on the New York stage, he has starred in The Agony & the Agony (2006), Xanadu (2007; Drama League, Drama Desk nominations), Damn Yankees (2008), Finian's Rainbow (2010; Drama Desk nomination), 8 (2011), The Heart of the Matter (2012), The Performers (2013), and Into the Woods (2022).

He has also appeared in a number of films, including the 2006 Academy Award-nominated United 93, in which his portrayal of Mark Bingham earned him the Boston Society of Film Critics 2006 award for Best Ensemble Cast. He also had a leading role in the 2014 independent romantic comedy ensemble, Mutual Friends, and guest roles in television series such as NBC's 30 Rock and Fox's Glee. Beginning in 2015, Jackson starred in the FX horror anthology television series American Horror Story in its fifth, sixth, seventh, and eighth seasons.

In concert, Jackson has sold out Carnegie Hall twice: The Power of Two in 2010 and Music of the Mad Men Era in 2011. He also performs in cabarets. In addition to his Broadway cast albums, he has released three albums of popular music, including a joint album called The Power of Two with Michael Feinstein in 2008. In 2012, Jackson released two singles, "Drive" and "Before You", from his 2013 album I'm Blue, Skies. In 2016, Jackson released his third studio album, Renaissance, an album adapted and expanded from his solo concert Music of the Mad Men Era.

He also stars as Hades in Disney Channel's Descendants 3. In 2020, he reunited with Descendants alumni Kenny Ortega and Booboo Stewart in Netflix's Julie and the Phantoms.

Early life
Jackson was born at Deaconess Hospital in Spokane, Washington, on July 12, 1975, to David and Sherri Jackson, and was named by his father after the 1950s Western series Cheyenne. The third of four children, he was raised in Oldtown, Idaho, a "teeny mill town" in a rural area in northern Idaho near the Washington border. His father was a Vietnam veteran. His mother taught Jackson, his sister, and his two brothers to sing and regularly played music by Joan Baez, Joni Mitchell, Bob Dylan, and Elvis Presley at home. Throughout his childhood, Jackson lived with his family in a rural home that had an outhouse and no running water. He moved to Spokane as a teenager.

In Seattle, Jackson worked as an ad executive at a magazine and did some theater work on the side, earning his Equity card. "As soon as I found out what theater was, what Broadway was, I thought, 'Oh, that's what I'll do with my life.' Just a matter of getting all the pieces in place", he said. Inspired to rethink his career after the September 11 attacks, he moved to New York City to pursue his dream of being an actor: "[Acting] was something I always wanted to do but I was too scared and didn't have the confidence. 9/11 changed everything for all of us. It gave me the urgency."

Career

Theatrical acting career
In regional theaters, Jackson has appeared as Tony in West Side Story, as Joey in The Most Happy Fella, as Cain in Children of Eden, as Berger in Hair, as Billy Bigelow in Carousel, as Joe Hardy in Damn Yankees, as Rocky in The Rocky Horror Show, and as The Poet in Kismet, among many other productions.

Jackson made his Broadway debut understudying both male leads in the Tony Award-winning musical Thoroughly Modern Millie. He later served as the standby for the character of Radames in Aida, then originated the role of Matthew in the off-Broadway production of Altar Boyz. In 2005, he originated his first Broadway leading role in the musical All Shook Up, a tribute to Elvis Presley. His performance as Chad earned him much critical praise, the Theatre World Award, and nominations from the Drama League and Outer Critics Circle Awards for Outstanding Lead Actor. In 2006, Jackson starred off-Broadway in playwright Nicky Silver's The Agony and The Agony with Victoria Clark. In June 2007, less than a week before the scheduled opening night, Jackson assumed the lead role of Sonny on Broadway in Xanadu, replacing James Carpinello who had been injured during rehearsal. Previous workshop productions of the musical starred Jackson and Jane Krakowski. However, both Jackson and Krakowski opted out of the initial Broadway run, citing schedule conflicts. His performance as Sonny earned him nominations from the Drama League and Drama Desk for Outstanding Lead Actor. Xanadu had several Tony Award nominations including "Best New Musical" for which Jackson and the cast performed on the 62nd Tony Awards show.

In 2008, Jackson joined Jane Krakowski and Sean Hayes in the New York City Center's Encores! production of Damn Yankees. He returned to Encores! in 2009, playing Woody Mahoney in a staged concert of Finian's Rainbow which critics praised. Jackson also starred in the development workshop of The Book of Mormon by Trey Parker, Matt Stone, and Robert Lopez, who co-wrote the music for Avenue Q.

In October 2009, Jackson opened on Broadway to positive critical reviews reprising the role of Woody Mahoney in the Broadway revival of the 1947 musical Finian's Rainbow at the St. James Theatre, costarring with Jim Norton and Kate Baldwin. The Wall Street Journal raved, "The way that [Kate Baldwin] and Cheyenne Jackson sing "Old Devil Moon" is the stuff best-selling cast albums are made of." The show closed on January 17, 2010. Along with the company of Finian's Rainbow, Jackson recorded the Broadway revival cast album in early December 2009, with a release date of February 2, 2010.

In September 2011, Jackson joined Morgan Freeman, Ellen Barkin, Matt Bomer, Christine Lahti, and John Lithgow as part of the Broadway-premiere cast of Dustin Lance Black's new play 8, directed by Joe Mantello. In June 2012, Jackson starred opposite Krysten Ritter in Neil LaBute's The Heart of The Matter produced by MCC Theater at the Lucille Lortel Theatre.

In the 2012–2013 Broadway season, Jackson, Henry Winkler, Alicia Silverstone, Daniel Breaker, Jenni Barber and Ari Graynor starred in David West Read's play The Performers which started previews on October 23, 2012, at the Longacre Theatre. The play closed on November 18, 2012, after 23 previews and 7 regular performances. Critical reception for the overall play was mixed with an median Stage Grade of C. However, a majority of reviewers including Entertainment Weekly, The Hollywood Reporter, The New York Times, and The Associated Press gave extremely positive reviews to both Jackson's and Ari Graynor's performances. Broadway producers cited the effects of Hurricane Sandy on the box office as the primary reason for the show's early closing.

In 2019, Jackson made his Hollywood Bowl debut playing the roles of the Wolf/Cinderella’s Prince in the show Into the Woods opposite Sutton Foster, Sierra Boggess, Patina Miller, Skylar Astin, Chris Carmack, and Shanice Williams. He later reprised these roles while temporarily filling in for Gavin Creel in the 2022 Broadway revival at the St. James Theatre opposite Miller, Sara Bareilles, Brian D'Arcy James, Phillipa Soo, Joshua Henry, and Julia Lester.

Film career
In films, Jackson most notably portrayed 9/11 victim and hero Mark Bingham in the 2006 Academy Award nominated United 93 which earned him the Boston Society of Film Critics 2006 award for Best Ensemble Cast. He has also appeared in several other films including: Curiosity (2005), Hysteria (2010), Smile (2011), the critically lauded The Green (opposite Julia Ormond and Illeana Douglas), and 2012 Sundance Film Festival selection Price Check (with Parker Posey). He portrayed Greta Gerwig's boyfriend Roger in the 2012 Fox Searchlight Pictures film Lola Versus. In 2013, he starred in the HBO biopic of Liberace, Behind the Candelabra, with Michael Douglas and Matt Damon. He also appeared in the independent films Mutual Friends (2013), Lucky Stiff (2014), and A Beautiful Now (2015). More recently, he played Hades in the Disney Channel original movie Descendants 3 (2019).

Jackson had a lead role in the film version of Six Dance Lessons in Six Weeks in 2014. He played Michael Minetti, who is hired by retiree Lily Harrison (Gena Rowlands) to give her private dance lessons at her home for six weeks. The film is based on Richard Alfieri's Broadway play of the same name and is directed by Arthur Allan Seidelman.

Television career
From 2009 through 2013, Jackson had a recurring role on the award-winning series 30 Rock playing Danny Baker. Jackson also portrayed Dustin Goolsby, the coach of "Vocal Adrenaline", the main rival of "New Directions", on the second season of FOX's show Glee.

He has guest starred on several television series, including Lipstick Jungle, Life on Mars, and Ugly Betty, and was featured in a prominent guest role during Season 8 of Curb Your Enthusiasm. His character "Terry" was the personal trainer to Larry David and Wanda Sykes. On March 15, 2010, Jackson made his guest-starring debut on the long-running NBC series Law & Order in an episode entitled "Innocence".

In 2008, Jackson played series lead Sebastian Kinglare for the Lifetime Television pilot Family Practice opposite Anne Archer and Beau Bridges. The series was not picked up for distribution.

In 2010, Jackson filmed a sitcom pilot for ABC-TV called It Takes a Village, co-starring Leah Remini, which was not picked up for the fall 2010 season.

In 2012, Jackson and Nathan Lane were cast as series leads in the USA Network comedy pilot Local Talent. The series was not picked up for distribution.

Additionally, Jackson guest starred on the pilot episode of NBC's revamp of The Munsters, Mockingbird Lane, written by Bryan Fuller and directed by Bryan Singer. Jackson portrayed Scout Master Steve, a competing love interest for Portia de Rossi's character Lily Munster; the show also stars Eddie Izzard and Jerry O'Connell. NBC aired the pilot as a Halloween special on October 26, 2012.

Jackson also appeared in the fifth season of American Horror Story as one of the leads alongside Lady Gaga and Matt Bomer. Jackson returned to the show's sixth season to play Network Executive Sidney Aaron James as well as the seventh season to play psychiatrist Dr. Rudy Vincent Anderson and the eighth season of the show to play warlock John Henry Moore.

Jackson made several appearances on RuPaul's Drag Race. He also appeared in the tenth episode of Season 2 of Sense8 as Blake Huntington, an award-winning actor who is cast opposite Miguel Ángel Silvestre's Lito Rodríguez in a Hollywood film. In 2019, he played the role of Hades, Mal's father in the Disney Channel Original Movie Descendants 3.

Jackson has starred in several notable webisode series including Cubby Bernstein opposite Nathan Lane, Legally Brown with Allison Janney, and The [title of show] Show from the meta-fictional Broadway musical [Title of Show].

Since 2020, Jackson costars as Max in the Fox comedy series Call Me Kat opposite Mayim Bialik and Kyla Pratt.

In 2022, Jackson competed in season seven of The Masked Singer as "Prince" of Team Good. He finished in third place.

Musical career
Early in his career, Jackson worked as a back-up singer for Vanessa Williams and Heather Headley.

In March 2009, Jackson made his nightclub debut at Feinstein's at Loews Regency with a sold-out one-man show titled Back to the Start. He later teamed up with Michael Feinstein to create a well-received nightclub act titled "The Power of Two". A CD of the show was released on November 3, 2009.

The Power of Two, a concert reuniting Jackson and Feinstein, was presented at Carnegie Hall on October 29, 2010. Jackson was the guest artist performing with the New York Pops in concert, Cheyenne Jackson's Cocktail Hour: Music of the Mad Men Era, at Carnegie Hall on November 18, 2011. Joe Dziemianowicz of The New York Daily News wrote, "There, in Judy (Garland)'s spot singing Joni (Mitchell)'s song, (Cheyenne) Jackson turned the bittersweet ballad into a beautiful highlight in an evening filled with luscious moments with the New York Pops."

On December 31, 2012, Jackson reprised Music of the Mad Men Era at The Kennedy Center Concert Hall with 96 members of the National Symphony Orchestra, and his special musical guest, Tony winner Nina Arianda. The concert sold out within days and was hailed by critics as stunning, surprising, and a cool way to ring in 2013.

In March 2012, Jackson was signed to Sony/ATV publishing as a songwriter and given a developmental artist deal through Sony/ATV's Hickory Records and Red Distribution.

On May 10, 2012, Jackson released his single "Drive", his first non-theatrical single and his first music video release. The video was directed by Austrian music video director Christian Hörlesberger and the track produced by Thomas "Tawgs" Salter. It was the first single released from I'm Blue, Skies, which was eventually released in June 2013. The album was co-written by Jackson with Sia, Stephen "Stevie" Aiello, and Charlotte Sometimes.

On July 10, 2012, Jackson released his second single from I'm Blue, Skies, "Before You", also produced by Salter. In August 2012, "Before You" reached a peak of #31 on the Hot 100 AC chart. The music video for the single was directed by Nick Everhart and also stars Rachel Dratch and Christina Cole. It was inspired by the 1960s monster TV shows The Addams Family and The Munsters as well as classic cinema of the '30s, '40s, and '50s. The director said the film was a tribute to the Golden Age of Hollywood.

In 2013, he released three singles, "She's Pretty, She Lies", "Look at Me", and "I'm Blue, Skies", followed in 2015 with the single "Don't Wanna Know", all accompanied by music videos. On June 3, 2016, Jackson released Renaissance, an album on the PS Classics record label, adapted and expanded from his solo concert Music of the Mad Men Era.

In the media
Jackson appeared on the March 26, 2008, cover of The Advocate. The magazine used the caption: "Hello, gorgeous! For leading man Cheyenne Jackson, coming out is a beautiful thing." In 2008, he was named "Entertainer of the Year" by Out and appeared alongside Gus Van Sant, Katy Perry, and Sam Sparro on the magazine's commemorative 100th issue in December. In April 2010, he appeared on the cover of Canadian fab magazine under the title "Cheyenne Jackson: I Love New York" with photographs by Mike Ruiz. He also appeared on Outs November 2010 issue. In July 2012, he appeared on the cover of attitude.

Charity work
Jackson is an LGBT rights advocate. He is an international ambassador for amfAR (The Foundation for AIDS Research).

Jackson is also a national ambassador and spokesperson for the Hetrick-Martin Institute, a non-profit organization devoted to serving the needs of LGBT youth.

Personal life
Jackson is gay. He began dating Monte Lapka, a physicist, in 2000. The two married on September 3, 2011, in New York City. In July 2013, they announced plans to divorce. They filed for divorce in September 2013.

In October 2013, Jackson announced he was dating actor Jason Landau on his official Instagram account. They announced their engagement in February 2014 and married in Encino, California, in September 2014. Jackson and Landau became the parents of twins, a girl named Willow and boy named Ethan, in October 2016.

Jackson is a recovering alcoholic, having achieved sobriety in 2013.

Discography

Studio albums

Original Broadway cast albums
 All Shook Up (2005)
 Xanadu (2007)
 Finian's Rainbow (2009)

Soundtrack appearances
 Julie and the Phantoms: Music from the Netflix Original Series (2020)

Singles
2012: "Drive"
2012: "Before You"
2013: "Don't Wanna Know"
2015: "Find the Best of Me"

Music videos
2012: "Drive"
2012: "Before You"
2013: "Don't Wanna Know"
2013: "Don't Look at Me"
2013: "She's Pretty, She Lies"
2013: "I'm Blue, Skies"

Filmography

Film

Television

Stage

Awards and honors

See also
 LGBT culture in New York City
 List of LGBT people from New York City

References

External links

 Official Website
 
 

1975 births
21st-century American male actors
American male film actors
American male musical theatre actors
American male stage actors
American male television actors
American people who self-identify as being of Native American descent
American gay actors
American gay musicians
HIV/AIDS activists
LGBT people from Idaho
LGBT people from Washington (state)
American LGBT rights activists
American LGBT singers
Living people
Male actors from Idaho
Male actors from Washington (state)
People from Bonner County, Idaho
Theatre World Award winners
20th-century American LGBT people
21st-century American LGBT people